Brijesh Kumar Tripathi, known by his stage name Brijesh Shandilya, is an Indian playback singer from Uttar Pradesh.

Early life
Brijesh Shandilya was born in Basti District of Uttar Pradesh. He started learning classical music vocal from Prayag Sangeet Samiti  in 2000 and completed in 2005. Later in 2006 he came to Mumbai

Career
Brijesh initial training was in Indian Classical music. He learnt vocals primarily but also plays the tabla, guitar, and harmonium. His music covers genres such as new-age Indian classical music, Bollywood music.

His latest Bollywood song is the title track from the movie Golmaal Again (2017). Another hot song is "Banno" from the movie Tanu Weds Manu: Returns (2015). In 2016, he sang "Sarrainodu" the title song for the film Sarrainodu. In 2008, he sang "Hooriyaan" for the film Oye Lucky! Lucky Oye!. In 2013 he also sang "Fauji" from the movie War Chhod Na Yaar. In 2015, he sang "Mera Nachan Nu", for the film Airlift.

Filmography

Awards and achievements 
Brijesh Shandilya has received awards and honors, including GiMA Awards, Radio Mirchi Awards in the year 2016 and 2020.
Brijesh Shandilya performed At The Royal Stag Mirchi Music Awards with Swati Sharma.

See also
 List of Indian playback singers

References

External links
 Official Facebook Page
 
 

Living people
1980 births
Indian male playback singers
Singers from Uttar Pradesh
People from Basti district